Defoort is a surname. Notable people with the surname include:

André Defoort (1914–1972), Belgian racing cyclist
Eric Defoort (1943–2016), Flemish Belgian politician and president of the European Free Alliance
Kris Defoort (born 1959), Belgian avant-garde jazz pianist and composer